Atlanta is a city in Cass County, northeastern Texas, United States. According to the 2010 U.S. census, the city had a population of 5,675, which decreased to 5,433 in 2020.

History
Atlanta was established in 1872 with the building of the Texas and Pacific Railway and was named for Atlanta, Georgia, former home of many early settlers; a post office was opened that same year. Atlanta, Texas is now the second largest Atlanta in the nation. Other "Atlantas" exist in Arkansas, Louisiana, Missouri, and elsewhere. Atlanta, Texas is known as "Hometown, USA".

By 1885 the community had 1,500 residents, who had founded three white and two black churches, two schools, a bank, several sawmills, a number of general stores, and a weekly newspaper, the Citizens' Journal. Lumbering was the chief industry. The lumber boom reached its peak around 1890, when the population was 1,764. When the community was incorporated in 1929, it had 1,900 residents and 105 businesses.

The onset of the Great Depression in the 1930s forced many businesses to close, and in 1936 Atlanta had 85 rated businesses. The opening of the Rodessa oilfield in 1935, however, helped mitigate the worst effects of the Depression. By 1940 the town had modern canneries, lumber mills, wholesale houses, a brick plant, a hospital, and a population of 2,453. Subsequently, Atlanta grew steadily, topping the 4,000 mark for the first time in the early 1960s. In 1990 the population was 6,118. By 2000 the population had dropped to 5,745. Principal industries include farming, forestry, oil, and tourism.

Geography
Atlanta is the largest city in Cass county and is located in eastern Cass County at  (33.118228, –94.166537). It is bordered to the north by Queen City.

U.S. Route 59 bypasses the city to the west, leading north  to Texarkana and southwest  to Linden. Texas State Highway 77 passes through the southern side of the city, leading southeast  to the Louisiana border and northwest  to Douglassville. Texas State Highway 43 passes through the center of Atlanta and leads south  to Marshall.

Climate
The climate in this area is characterized by hot, humid summers and generally mild to cool winters.  According to the Köppen Climate Classification system, Atlanta has a humid subtropical climate, abbreviated "Cfa" on climate maps.

Demographics

As of the 2020 United States census, there were 5,433 people, 2,118 households, and 1,466 families residing in the city.

As of the census of 2010, there were 5,745 people, 2,254 households, and 1,571 families residing in the city. The population density was 525.4 people per square mile (202.9/km2). There were 2,556 housing units at an average density of 233.8 per square mile (90.3/km2). The racial makeup of the city was 68.13% White, 29.23% African American, 0.52% Native American, 0.37% Asian, 0.02% Pacific Islander, 0.49% from other races, and 1.25% from two or more races. Hispanic or Latino of any race were 1.72% of the population.

There were 2,254 households, of which 32.9% had children under the age of 18 living with them, 47.0% were married couples living together, 18.6% had a female householder with no husband present, and 30.3% were non-families. 27.7% of all households were made up of individuals, and 14.5% had someone living alone who was 65 years of age or older. The average household size was 2.46 and the average family size was 2.98.

In the city, the population was spread out, with 27.0% under the age of 18, 8.7% from 18 to 24, 24.0% from 25 to 44, 21.4% from 45 to 64, and 19.0% who were 65 years of age or older. The median age was 37 years. For every 100 females, there were 83.7 males. For every 100 females age 18 and over, there were 74.5 males.

The median income for a household in the city was $27,188, and the median income for a family was $32,679. Males had a median income of $29,286 versus $19,715 for females. The per capita income for the city was $14,013. About 19.0% of families and 23.5% of the population were below the poverty line, including 33.4% of those under age 18 and 19.4% of those age 65 or over.

Education
Most of Atlanta is served by the Atlanta Independent School District, which operates Atlanta High School. A portion is instead zoned to Queen City Independent School District, which operates Queen City High School.

Atlanta is also served by Texarkana College and Texas A&M-Texarkana.

Notable people

 Derrick Blaylock, football player, drafted into the NFL in 2001 by the Kansas City Chiefs as a running back. He was a running back for the Stephen F. Austin State University Lumberjacks from 1997 to 2000. He played for the New York Jets and Washington Redskins after college
 Susanna Clark, artist and country/folk songwriter, was born in Atlanta 
 Bessie Coleman (1892–1926), a civil aviator. She was born in Atlanta and raised in Waxahachie, Texas. She was the first female pilot of African-American and Native American descent to hold a pilot's license in the US, and the first person of African-American descent to hold an international pilot license
 Ellen DeGeneres, talk show host and comedian. In January 1974, she and her mother moved to Atlanta from New Orleans. She graduated from Atlanta High School in 1976
 Phil Epps, former American football wide receiver for the Green Bay Packers (1982–1988) and the New York Jets (1989). He attended Texas Christian University
 Tracy Lawrence, country musician; born in Atlanta and raised in Foreman, Arkansas
 Andrea Lee, Andrea "KGB" Lee (born February 11, 1989) is an American kickboxer and mixed martial artist who competes in the flyweight division. She is currently signed with UFC
 Gordon McLendon, pioneer of American commercial broadcasting, he lived with his parents in Atlanta during his years of high school. He developed a love for commentary which he featured on the Liberty Broadcasting System and KLIF in Dallas
 Travis Ransom, Command Sergeant Major, US Army and former Mayor of the City of Atlanta is currently Cass County Judge
 Slim Richey (1938–2015), musician, was born in Atlanta
 Max Sandlin, Max Allen Sandlin Jr. (born September 29, 1952) is the son of the former Margie Beth Barnett and her husband Max Allen Sandlin Sr., Reared in Atlanta, he graduated from Atlanta High School in May, 1971. Sandlin is a former Democratic Congressman who served eight years (1997–2005) in the U.S. House of Representatives representing Texas District 1
 Joseph Strickland, bishop of the Roman Catholic Diocese of Tyler
 Drew Stubbs, outfielder for the Baltimore Orioles. Stubbs graduated from Atlanta High School in 2003. He was a three-time All-American in baseball and two-time academic All-American at the University of Texas at Austin
 Nat Stuckey, American country singer
 Ted Thompson, former general manager of the Green Bay Packers, born and raised in Atlanta, he graduated from Atlanta High School in 1971. He was a part of the NFL for 25 years, including 10 years as a player for the Houston Oilers

References

External links

 AtlantaTexas.org - City website by the Atlanta City Development Corporation..
 Texas State Historical Association - Atlanta, TX information

Cities in Texas
Cities in Cass County, Texas
Cities in the Ark-La-Tex
Populated places established in 1871
1871 establishments in Texas